The counties of Wales may refer to: 

 Some Principal areas of Wales; of the twenty-two, eleven are styled as "counties".
Preserved counties of Wales, used for ceremonial purposes
Former administrative counties of Wales (those prior to 1996) — see History of local government in Wales
Historic counties of Wales

Maps: